BSix Sixth Form College: Brooke House is a sixth form college located in Upper Clapton, London, England. It was established in 2002, giving students in Hackney the opportunity to study at a college close to where they live. Brooke House has previously been the site of other educational institutions.

History
BSix Brooke House Sixth Form College was opened on the Brooke House school site in September 2002, on a site that was previously part of Hackney College. It was set up by the then Secretary of State for Education, David Blunkett, and formed part of an unrealised plan to build eleven new sixth form colleges in London. BSix is unusual in the sixth form college sector because it offers courses at all levels and across a wide range of subjects, including vocational courses, like hair and beauty, business and art as well as a significant number of A-Levels.

After an initial surge of enthusiasm, the educational context changed rapidly. Hackney's local education authority, the Learning Trust, introduced a programme to create five City Academies in the borough, all with sixth forms. As a consequence, many other 11-16 schools applied to open their own sixth forms.
 
The growth in student recruitment was not as rapid as the Learning and Skills Council (LSC), the funding body, had anticipated. Although by 2019 it had seen improvements to A and AS level results.

Students
In 2014, around 88% of its pupils came from disadvantaged areas.

References

External links
 College Website

Sixth form colleges in London
Education in the London Borough of Hackney
Educational institutions established in 2002
2002 establishments in England
Clapton, London